Jodi Marie Benson (née Marzorati; born October 10, 1961) is an American actress and singer. She is best known for providing the voice of Ariel in Disney's 1989 animated film The Little Mermaid and throughout other films, including its sequel, prequel, and television series spin-off, as well as many other Disney works going up to the present day of the 2020s. Benson also filled in for Paige O'Hara as the voice of Belle in House of Mouse and voiced the character Barbie in the second and third films of the Toy Story franchise (1999–2010), and in the Toy Story Toons short Hawaiian Vacation (2011). For her contributions to Disney, Benson was named a Disney Legend in 2011.

She also gave voice to the spirited "Weebo" in Disney's live action Flubber, starring Robin Williams. For Warner Bros., she did the voice of the title character in Thumbelina in 1994, a Don Bluth animated feature film with songs by Barry Manilow. Her other projects include Secret of the Wings, Lady and the Tramp II: Scamp's Adventure, 101 Dalmatians II: Patch's London Adventure, Balto: Wolf Quest, and Balto III: Wings of Change. She appeared as Patrick Dempsey's assistant Sam in Disney's live-action feature film Enchanted. While being a Disney Legend, she also voiced Jane Doe and Patsy Smiles in Cartoon Network's Camp Lazlo. She also voiced the character Tula in Hanna-Barbera's animated series The Pirates of Dark Water.

Personal life 
Benson was born and raised in a Catholic family, graduating from Boylan Central Catholic High School in Rockford, Illinois, and Millikin University in Decatur, Illinois.

She experienced a religious conversion while dating actor/singer Ray Benson (not to be confused with frontman Ray Benson of Asleep at the Wheel). The two of them later married in 1984. They have two children, McKinley and Delaney. An article originally published in 2013 by the Billy Graham Evangelistic Association said the couple "live north of Atlanta, GA."

Career 

Benson made her debut in the 1983 Kenny Ortega-directed "Marilyn: An American Fable".  Other Broadway credits include a starring role in the 1986 Broadway musical Smile, where she introduced a song called "Disneyland". In 1987, Howard Ashman, the lyricist of Smile, would go on to write the lyrics for The Little Mermaid. She describes the song "Disneyland" at the "Smile" Reunion concert held on September 22, 2014, "This is the first piece of the puzzle of my life, the first step of the journey, so to speak".  Benson also sings "Disneyland" on a compilation CD called Unsung Musicals. In 1989, Benson appeared in the Broadway musical, Welcome to the Club, alongside Samuel E. Wright, who performed the voice for Sebastian the Crab in The Little Mermaid.

In 1992, Benson received a Tony Award nomination for Best Actress in a Musical for her role as Polly Baker in Crazy For You. She played the narrator in Joseph And The Amazing Technicolor Dreamcoat in 1998.

In 2004–06, Benson became the host and narrator of the children's Christian home video series called "Baby Faith", created by Integrity Publishers & FamilyTreeMedia.

Benson also played the Queen in a one-night concert version of Rodgers & Hammersteins Cinderella at the Nashville Symphony Orchestra in May 2010.

She was at the 2012 SYTA conference singing her signature song "Part of Your World" on August 27, 2012.

Benson has been the guest artist for the Candlelight Processional for five years at Walt Disney World including December 10–13, 2012.

She joined the "2013 Spring Pops" on May 14–15, 2013 as a guest soloist with the Boston Pops.

Benson can be heard on over a dozen recordings. Her animated TV series include the Emmy Award-winning Camp Lazlo for the Cartoon Network, The Little Mermaid, Batman Beyond, The Grim Adventures of Billy and Mandy, The Wild Thornberrys, Barbie, Hercules: Zero to Hero, P. J. Sparkles, and the series Sofia the First for Disney.

On the concert stage, Benson has performed as a concert soloist with symphonies all over the world, including The Boston Pops, The Philly Pops (conductor: Peter Nero), The Hollywood Bowl Orchestra (conductor: John Mauceri), The National Symphony (conductor: Marvin Hamlisch), Cleveland, Dallas, Tokyo, and the San Francisco and Chicago Symphonies. She starred in the Kennedy Center Honors for Ginger Rogers, and in Disney's Premiere in Central Park with Pocahontas, The Walt Disney World 25th Anniversary Spectacular and Disney's 100 Years of Magic. Benson is the resident guest soloist for the Walt Disney Company/Disney Cruise Line and ambassador for feature animation.

On June 6, 2016, Benson performed the role of Ariel at the Hollywood Bowl's concert performance of The Little Mermaid. She also made a special appearance in ABC's 2019 live musical spectacular The Little Mermaid Live! She recently lent her voice to Ariel in the 2022 video game Disney Dreamlight Valley as well as singing as Ariel on various Disney Princess albums of the 2000s. From 1992 to 2011 she was the official voice of Barbie for Mattel and Pixar for projects such as Toy Story and Dance! Workout with Barbie, until the role was taken over by Kate Higgins starting with the series Life in the Dreamhouse.

The Little Mermaid 

In late 1986, Benson first heard of the audition for The Little Mermaid through lyricist and playwright Howard Ashman. The two had just worked together in the Broadway show Smile until its run ended early. He knew she would be the perfect fit for the role and that she would be a great replica of Ariel. After hearing the demo for "Part of Your World", she sang a small part of it on tape where it was later sent to Disney executives. Before her audition for The Little Mermaid, she was primarily a stage actress. It was Ashman's first Disney project. In early 1988, Benson won the role of Ariel and has been voicing her ever since.

Filmography

Film

Television

Video games

Theme parks

Stage

Discography

Awards and nominations

References

External links 

 
 
 
 Jodi Benson at the Disney Legends Website
 Performance Working in the Theatre seminar video at American Theatre Wing.org, April 1992

1961 births
Actresses from Illinois
Musicians from Rockford, Illinois
American Christians
American musical theatre actresses
American voice actresses
American film actresses
American sopranos
American video game actresses
Audiobook narrators
Living people
Actors from Rockford, Illinois
20th-century American actresses
20th-century Christians
21st-century American actresses
21st-century Christians
20th-century American singers
Traditional pop music singers
20th-century American women singers
21st-century American women singers
Hanna-Barbera people
Disney people